Hunting of Fools is a 1984 South Korean film directed by Kim Ki-young.

Synopsis

A social drama about two men who have failed to graduate from college.

Cast

 Eom Sim-jeong
 Kim Seong-geun
 Bae Gyu-bin
 Kim In-moon
 Kim Won-seop
 Yoon In-Ja
 No Gyeong-sin
 Park Am
 Kim Sung-kyom
 Jang Hyeok

Notes

Bibliography
 
 
 

1984 films
1980s Korean-language films
South Korean drama films
Films directed by Kim Ki-young